KWQR (92.5 FM) is a radio station licensed to serve the community of Willcox, Arizona. The station is owned by Mark Lucke, through licensee Versailles Community Broadcasting, Inc., and airs a classic hits format described as "X-Wave".

The station was assigned the KWQR call letters by the Federal Communications Commission on March 9, 2017.

References

External links
 Official Website
 

WQR
Radio stations established in 2017
2017 establishments in Arizona
Classic hits radio stations in the United States
Cochise County, Arizona